Lynne Ober (born July 10, 1943) is an American politician from the state of New Hampshire. She is a former member of the New Hampshire House of Representatives, sitting as a Republican from the Hillsborough 37th district, having been first elected in 2004.

During the 2021 New Hampshire budget negotiations, Ober, as vice chair of the house finance committee, disobeyed directions by house speaker Sherman Packard and majority leader Jason Osborne to wait for negotiations to be completed before calling a vote on emergency powers and paid family leave components of the budget. Packard then stripped Ober of her committee leadership positions. She and her husband Russell Ober then resigned in protest.

References

Living people
1945 births
Republican Party members of the New Hampshire House of Representatives
University System of Maryland alumni
University of Southern California alumni
Women state legislators in New Hampshire
People from Hudson, New Hampshire
21st-century American women politicians
21st-century American politicians
20th-century American women
20th-century American people